Hamlets in the Canadian province of Alberta are unincorporated communities administered by, and within the boundaries of, specialized municipalities or rural municipalities (municipal districts, improvement districts and special areas). They consist of five or more dwellings (a majority of which are on parcels of land that are smaller than 1,850 m2), have a generally accepted boundary and name, and contain parcels of land used for non-residential purposes.

Section 59 of the Municipal Government Act (MGA) enables specialized municipalities and municipal districts to designate a hamlet, while Section 590 of the MGA enables the Minister of Alberta Municipal Affairs to designate a hamlet within an improvement district.  The Minister may also designate a hamlet within a special area pursuant to Section 10 of the Special Areas Act.

A hamlet can be incorporated as a village when its population reaches 300. However, Alberta has not had a hamlet incorporate as a village since January 1, 1980, when both Barnwell and Wabamun incorporated as villages. Since then, it has been more common for urban municipalities to dissolve from their current municipal status to that of a hamlet under the jurisdiction of its surrounding specialized or rural municipality. As such, the number of hamlets in Alberta has steadily grown over the years.

As of 2021, Alberta has 403 hamlets recognized by Alberta Municipal Affairs. Alberta's two largest hamlets – Fort McMurray (formerly a city) within the Regional Municipality of Wood Buffalo and Sherwood Park within Strathcona County – have been further designated as urban service areas by Municipal Affairs. If they were to incorporate as cities, Fort McMurray and Sherwood Park would rank fifth and sixth respectively among Alberta's largest cities by population. Alberta's newest hamlet is Hythe, whose village government dissolved on July 1, 2021, to become a hamlet under the jurisdiction of the County of Grande Prairie No. 1.

The latest populations of hamlets are not published by Municipal Affairs, with the exception of the two urban service areas.

List of hamlets 

Notes:

Former hamlets 
Numerous communities in Alberta have been previously recognized as hamlets by the Province of Alberta. The following are those hamlets that have been absorbed by urban municipalities through annexation or amalgamation.

See also 

List of census divisions of Alberta
List of cities in Alberta
List of communities in Alberta
List of designated places in Alberta
List of former urban municipalities in Alberta
List of ghost towns in Alberta
List of Indian reserves in Alberta
List of localities in Alberta
List of municipal districts in Alberta
List of municipalities in Alberta
List of population centres in Alberta
List of settlements in Alberta
List of specialized municipalities in Alberta
List of summer villages in Alberta
List of towns in Alberta
List of villages in Alberta

References 

 
Hamlets